Tales of Ordinary Madness is one of two collections of short stories by Charles Bukowski that City Lights Publishers culled from its 1972 paperback volume Erections, Ejaculations, Exhibitions, and General Tales of Ordinary Madness. (The other volume is  entitled  The Most Beautiful Woman in Town). Both volumes were first published in 1983 and remain in print.

Contents
A .45 To Pay The Rent
Doing Time With Public Enemy No. 1
Scenes From The Big Time
Nut Ward Just East Of Hollywood
Would You Suggest Writing As A Career?
The Great Zen Wedding
Reunion
Cunt And Kant And A Happy Home
Goodbye Watson
Great Poets Die In Steaming Pots Of Shit
My Stay In The Poet's Cottage
The Stupid Christs
Too Sensitive
Rape! Rape!
An Evil Town
Love It Or Leave It
A Dollar And Twenty Cents
No Stockings
A Quiet Conversation Piece
Beer And Poets And Talk
I Shot A Man In Reno
A Rain Of Women
Night Streets Of Madness
Purple As An Iris
Eyes Like The Sky
One For Walter Lowenfels
Notes Of A Potential Suicide
Notes On The Pest
A Bad Trip
Animal Crackers In My Soup
A Popular Man
Flower Horse
The Big Pot Game
The Blanket

External links 
 Quotes from Tales of Ordinary Madness
 Charles Bukowski on Censorship

1983 short story collections
Short story collections by Charles Bukowski
City Lights Publishers books